Paulina Woźniak (born 4 February 1992) is a Paralympic swimmer from Poland. She won a silver medal at the 2008 Summer Paralympics at the 100m Breaststroke class SB8. She won the Women's 100 metre breaststroke SB8 bronze for Poland at the 2012 Summer Paralympics. In 2010, she indicated her ambition was to be an art teacher.

References 

Swimmers at the 2008 Summer Paralympics
Paralympic silver medalists for Poland
1992 births
Living people
Polish female medley swimmers
Sportspeople from Szczecin
Polish female breaststroke swimmers
Medalists at the 2008 Summer Paralympics
Medalists at the 2012 Summer Paralympics
Paralympic bronze medalists for Poland
Paralympic swimmers of Poland
Medalists at the World Para Swimming Championships
Medalists at the World Para Swimming European Championships
Paralympic medalists in swimming
S8-classified Paralympic swimmers
20th-century Polish women
21st-century Polish women